Pranas Dovydaitis (2 December 1886 – 4 November 1942) was a Lithuanian politician, Prime Minister of Lithuania, teacher, encyclopedist, editor, and professor.

Biography 
Pranas Dovydaitis was born in Marijampolė County, Runkiai and attended Veiveriai Teachers' Seminary, later studied in the University of Moscow. In 1913 he became an editor of a newspaper Viltis in Vilnius. It was closed in 1915 and Dovydaitis went to Kaunas where he started to participate actively in its academic circles and from 1922 to 1940 was a professor in the University of Lithuania (now - Vytautas Magnus University). The range of topics of his articles was quite wide - religious science, philosophy and natural science, but in all his articles some synoptical-historical interest could be found. The topics of primitive man and culture were one of his priorities. He was a Signatory of the Act of Independence of Lithuania. After the Soviet occupation of Lithuania Dovydaitis was arrested in 1941 with his family and sent to one of the Soviet Gulag camps in the northern Ural. His remains have not yet been found. Dovydaitis was a member and one of the founders of the Catholic youth and student organization Ateitis in Lithuania which is now a full member of Fimcap.

Family 
Pranas Dovydaitis was the eldest of 15 children in his family. His wife - Marcelė Bucevičiūtė-Dovydaitienė. They had three sons and two daughters.

References 

 "Dovydaitis, Pranas". Encyclopedia Lituanica II: 101-103. (1970-1978). Ed. Simas Sužiedėlis. Boston, Massachusetts: Juozas Kapočius. LCCN 74-114275.
 "Žemaičių Krikšto Pėdsakais", 2013, Lietuvių Katalikų Mokslo Akademija, UDK 23/28(474.5)(091)(036) 

1886 births
1942 deaths
People from Kazlų Rūda Municipality
People from Suwałki Governorate
Prime Ministers of Lithuania
Members of the Council of Lithuania
Lithuanian independence activists
Lithuanian male writers
Lithuanian schoolteachers
Lithuanian encyclopedists
Lithuanian jurists
Executed prime ministers
Lithuanian people executed by the Soviet Union
Burials at Rasos Cemetery